In real analysis and measure theory, the Vitali convergence theorem, named after the Italian mathematician Giuseppe Vitali, is a generalization of the better-known dominated convergence theorem of Henri Lebesgue. It is a characterization of the convergence in Lp in terms of convergence in measure and a condition related to uniform integrability.

Preliminary definitions 
We adopt the following definitions according to Bogachev's terminology.

 A set of functions  is called uniformly integrable if , i.e  .
 A set of functions  is said to have uniformly absolutely continuous integrals if , i.e. . This definition is sometimes used as a definition of uniform integrability. However, it differs from the definition of uniform integrability given above.

If, in addition,  is atomless, then the uniform integrability is equivalent to the uniform absolute continuity of integrals.

Finite measure case 
Let  and  be an -measurable function. Then, the following are equivalent : 

For a proof, see Bogachev's monograph "Measure Theory, Volume I".

Infinite measure case
 has uniformly absolutely continuous integrals;
 For every , there exists  such that  and  
When , the third condition becomes superfluous (one can simply take ) and the first two conditions give the usual form of Lebesgue-Vitali's convergence theorem originally stated for measure spaces with finite measure. In this case, one can show that conditions 1 and 2 imply that the sequence  is uniformly integrable.

Converse of the theorem
Let  be measure space. Let  and assume that  exists for every . In addition, there exists  such that  for every .

When , this implies that  is uniformly integrable.

For a proof, see Bogachev's monograph "Measure Theory, Volume I".

Citations

Theorems in measure theory